William Corbin may refer to:

 William Corbin (author) (1916–1999), author of books for adults and children
 William E. Corbin (1869–1951), inventor of Nibroc paper towels and mayor of Berlin, New Hampshire
 William Herbert Corbin (1864–1945), American football player